The Extraordinary and Plenipotentiary Ambassador of Peru to the Republic of Singapore is the official representative of the Republic of Peru to the Republic of Singapore.

Both countries established relations in 1980 and have maintained them since. The ambassador in Singapore has also been accredited to Brunei until said country's representation was changed to Malaysia.

List of representatives

See also
List of ambassadors of Peru to Malaysia

References

Singapore
Peru